Shuswap-Revelstoke was a provincial electoral district in the Canadian province of British Columbia from 1979 to 1991.  The riding was formed by merging the northern portions of the Revelstoke-Slocan riding with the Shuswap riding.  The successor riding for the Revelstoke area is the current Columbia River-Revelstoke riding.

For other historical and current ridings in the region see Kootenay (electoral districts) and Okanagan (electoral districts).

Demographics

Political geography

Electoral history 

 
|Progressive Conservative
|Harold A. Smiley
|align="right"|1,557 		
|align="right"|7.01%
|align="right"|
|align="right"|unknown
|- bgcolor="white"
!align="right" colspan=3|Total valid votes
!align="right"|22,219
!align="right"|100.00%
!align="right"|
|- bgcolor="white"
!align="right" colspan=3|Total rejected ballots
!align="right"|293
!align="right"|
!align="right"|
|- bgcolor="white"
!align="right" colspan=3|Turnout
!align="right"|%
!align="right"|
!align="right"|
|}
	

 
|New Democrat
|William Stewart King
|align="right"|12,340 	 	 	
|align="right"|45.56%
|align="right"|
|align="right"|unknown

 
|Liberal
|Basil Edward Studer
|align="right"|642 	 		 		 	
|align="right"|2.37%
|align="right"|
|align="right"|unknown
|- bgcolor="white"
!align="right" colspan=3|Total valid votes
!align="right"|27,084 	
!align="right"|100.00%
!align="right"|
|- bgcolor="white"
!align="right" colspan=3|Total rejected ballots
!align="right"|320
!align="right"|
!align="right"|
|- bgcolor="white"
!align="right" colspan=3|Turnout
!align="right"|%
!align="right"|
!align="right"|
|}
	  	  	

 
|New Democrat
|Gordon S. Priestman
|align="right"|10,768 	 		 	
|align="right"|44.40
|align="right"|
|align="right"|unknown
 
|Liberal
|Basil Edward Studer
|align="right"|786 	  		 	 	
|align="right"|3.24%
|align="right"|
|align="right"|unknown

|- bgcolor="white"
!align="right" colspan=3|Total valid votes
!align="right"|24,253 
!align="right"|100.00%
!align="right"|
|- bgcolor="white"
!align="right" colspan=3|Total rejected ballots
!align="right"|452
!align="right"|
!align="right"|
|- bgcolor="white"
!align="right" colspan=3|Turnout
!align="right"|%
!align="right"|
!align="right"|
|}

Following the 1986 election the area was redistributed.  The Shuswap area became the Shuswap riding while the Revelstoke area became part of Columbia River-Revelstoke.

Sources 

Elections BC Historical Returns

Former provincial electoral districts of British Columbia